Carmelo Antrone Lee (born June 7, 1977) is an American professional basketball player currently playing for Atenienses de Manati of the Puerto Rico league Baloncesto Superior Nacional and Ironi Ramat Gan of the Israeli Basketball Super League. Lee has played with the Guaynabo Conquistadores in the National Superior Basketball league of Puerto Rico, he played with Vaqueros de Bayamón from 2009 to 2012. Internationally he has played with the Guaros (Venezuela), CAB (Portugal), Regatas C. (Argentina), LNBP (Mexico) and Metros (Dominican Republic). In 2007, Lee was included as a small forward in the Puerto Rico national basketball team. In 2009, he won the Puerto Rico national championship with Bayamon.

Early life
Lee was born in the United States to an African American mother and Puerto Rican father.

Career 
1995-1996: Florida (NCAA)
1997-1998: Long Beach St. (NCAA)
1998-1999: Long Beach St. (NCAA)
1999-2000: Long Beach St. (NCAA)
2000: Nike Summer League in Treviso (ITA)
2002: Austin Cyclones (XBL)
2003: Leñadores de Durango (MEX-LNBP)
2004: Leñadores Durango (MEX-LNBP), in Aug. moved to Cometas de Querétaro (MEX-LNBP) 17g 18.4ppg 6.1rpg 2.7apg
2005, February: BSN Pre-Draft Camp, Puerto Rico
2005 March: drafted by Isabela (BSN Draft 1st Round- Nr.2)
2005: Gallitos de Isabela (PUR-BSN): 32 games: 7.4ppg, 4.4rpg, 2.1apg, 2FGP: 47.0%, 3FGP: 25.0%, FT: 64.0%
2005: IN Aug. signed at Lobos Grises de la UAD (MEX-LNBP): 22 games: 21.3ppg, 7.2rpg, 2.0apg, 1.5spg, 1.5bpg, 2FGP: 53.0%, 3FGP: 33.5%, FT: 81.1%
2006: Conquistadores de Guaynabo (PUR-BSN,1T): 18.1ppg, 5.1rpg, 1.6bpg, in Sep. moved to Metros de Santiago (DOM-LIDOBA North)
2006-2007: Regatas Corrientes (ARG-LigaA), released in Nov.'06: 7 games: 8.3ppg, 4.3rpg, 1.0spg, 2FGP: 42.9%, 3FGP: 33.3%, FT: 80%, then moved to CAB Madeira Funchal (POR-UZO Liga): 1 game: 6pts, 1reb, 2ast; left in Jan.'07 because of injury
2007: In February signed at Guaros de Lara (VEN-LPB,1T), in April moved to Conquistadores de Guaynabo (PUR-BSN,1T)
2008:Signed for Ironi Ramat Gan
2009:Signed for Vaqueros de Bayamón (PUR-BSN)

Awards and achievements 

Mexican LNBP All-Star Game -2003
Puerto Rican National Team -2005–present
Mexican LNBP Regular Season Runner-Up -05
Centrobasket -2006: (Bronze): 5 games: 3.6ppg, 3.2rpg
World Championships in Japan -2006: 5 games: 3.0ppg, 1.2rpg
Dominican Rep. LIDOBA Finals MVP -2006
Dominican Rep. LIDOBA Champion -2006
Puerto Rican BSN All-Star Game -2006
Puerto Rican BSN Championship- 2009
Silver Medal (Puerto Rican National Team) Marchand Invitational Cup-2009
Silver Medal (Puerto Rican National Team) FIBA Americas Championship- 2009
Puerto Rican BSN All-Star Game-2010
Puerto Rican BSN All-Star-Game MVP- 2010

References

1977 births
Living people
2006 FIBA World Championship players
2010 FIBA World Championship players
American expatriate basketball people in Argentina
American expatriate basketball people in Israel
American expatriate basketball people in South Korea
American expatriate basketball people in Venezuela
American men's basketball players
Basketball players at the 2007 Pan American Games
Basketball players from Atlanta
Central American and Caribbean Games gold medalists for Puerto Rico
Central American and Caribbean Games medalists in basketball
Cometas de Querétaro players
Competitors at the 2006 Central American and Caribbean Games
Competitors at the 2010 Central American and Caribbean Games
Florida Gators men's basketball players
Guaros de Lara (basketball) players
Daegu KOGAS Pegasus players
Ironi Ramat Gan players
Israeli Basketball Premier League players
Leñadores de Durango players
Long Beach State Beach men's basketball players
Pan American Games medalists in basketball
Pan American Games silver medalists for Puerto Rico
Piratas de Quebradillas players
Power forwards (basketball)
Puerto Rican expatriate basketball people in Israel
Puerto Rican men's basketball players
Regatas Corrientes basketball players
Small forwards
Medalists at the 2007 Pan American Games